Stefánia Moldován (August 24, 1929, in Sajóudvarhely – April 12, 2012, in Budapest) was a Hungarian opera singer of Armenian origin. A student at the Franz Liszt Academy of Music from 1948 to 1953, she debuted as a dramatic soprano in a production of La bohème at the National Theatre of Szeged in 1954. From 1961 to 2012, she was a soloist at the Hungarian State Opera House.

References 

1929 births
2012 deaths
20th-century Hungarian women opera singers
21st-century Hungarian women opera singers
Hungarian sopranos